Elections to Brisbane City Council were held on Saturday, 28 April 2012 to elect a councillor to each of the local government area's 26 wards and the direct election of the Lord Mayor of Brisbane.

The election resulted in a landslide re-election of the Liberal National Party (previously represented in Queensland as the Liberal Party), increasing their representation by two wards. The incumbent Lord Mayor, Graham Quirk, was elected to his first full-term with a substantial 68.3% of the two-party-preferred vote.

Results

Mayoral election
Campbell Newman was elected Lord Mayor of Brisbane in 2008 as the Liberal Party candidate. In 2011 he resigned as Lord Mayor to be the Liberal National Party's candidate for Premier of Queensland. Graham Quirk was elected as Lord Mayor by the Councillors on 7 April 2011.

* Incumbent

1 Rory Killen was the candidate for the Australian Sex Party, but his party affiliation was not listed on the ballot paper

Councillor elections 
The Liberal National's gained the wards of Doboy and Karawatha from the Labor Party and lost the ward of Tennyson to an Independent, for a net gain of two wards and a majority of 18 wards, to their nearest competitor, Labor's at 7 wards. 

Wards with names listed in bold changed hands from Labor to Liberal National in the 2012 election.

Councillors whose names are in italics did not stand in the 2012 election for the seat they won in 2008.

1 Graham Quirk was appointed Lord Mayor after the resignation of Campbell Newman in 2011. Steven Huang was appointed Councillor for MacGregor Ward in his place.

2 Nicole Johnston was elected as a member of the LNP in 2008 but resigned from the party to sit as an Independent.

3 Jane Prentice resigned from Council in 2010 to contest the Federal electorate of Ryan for the LNP. Julian Simmonds of the LNP was elected Councillor at a by-election in October that year.

References

2012 elections in Australia
2010s in Brisbane
2012
April 2012 events in Australia